Mal-Mo-E: The Secret Mission is a 2019 South Korean historical drama film written and directed by Eom Yu-na. It was released on January 9, 2019. The title refers to an old Korean dialect word which roughly translates to "collecting vocabularies."

Synopsis
Imprisoned several times during the 1940s, when Korea was under Japanese occupation, Kim Pan-Soo is illiterate and does not know how to read or write Korean Hangul or any other language.  The teaching of Korean in the schools  is banned by the Imperial government. He meets a representative of the Korean Language Society and join forces to publish a dictionary of the Korean language.

Cast

Historical context 
The film is based on historical events in Korea during the late 1930s to 1940s. When Korea was under Japanese Imperial rule, the Korean language was "demoted" in status and significance and eventually outright banned in 1938 in favor of the Japanese language. The characters were based on the real-life scholars and members of the Korean Language Society who continued working on the dictionary even after the ban was enforced. In 1942, more than thirty of the group were arrested and imprisoned by the Japanese and two died in prison. The Korean Language Society did not resume activities until Korea re-gained independence after Japan surrendered to the Allies in 1945.

Reception 
The film debuted on top of the South Korean box office, where it earned $8.96 million from 1.19 million admissions between Wednesday and Sunday.

Local reviews of the film were largely positive, with South Korean English-language newspaper The Korea Times commending the film for being able to tell "the same old story of these historical figures....but in a fashionable way".

Movie Information 

 On December 18, 2018, at the entrance of Lotte Cinema Konkuk University, the press preview of <Malmoi> was attended by director  Eom Yu-na and the two main actors Yoo Hae-jin and Yoon Kye-sang.
 Mal-Mo-E,  which was released on January 9, 2019 (Wednesday), was screened 4,853 times on 1077 screens on the opening day, and attracted 122,458 audiences. By the 13th (Sunday), the first weekend, 1.18 million viewers were received. The final theater audience is 2.8 million.

References

External links
 
 

2019 films
2010s Korean-language films
2010s historical drama films
South Korean historical drama films
Drama films based on actual events
Films about language
Films set in Korea under Japanese rule
2019 drama films
2010s South Korean films